Acacia Villas is a census-designated place in Palm Beach County, Florida, United States. Its population was 398 as of the 2020 census. Acacia Villas is located on the east side of State Road 809; it borders Palm Springs on its north, east, and south sides.

Demographics

References

Census-designated places in Palm Beach County, Florida
Census-designated places in Florida